Henry Taber (1860–1936) was an American mathematician.

Biography
Taber studied mechanical engineering at Sheffield Scientific School from 1877 to 1882. Then, he went to Baltimore to study mathematics at Johns Hopkins University, under Charles Sanders Peirce and William Edward Story. He was awarded a doctorate in 1888, with a dissertation probably tutored by Story.

The following year he was assistant professor at Johns Hopkins, but in 1889, on Clark University's foundation hiring his teacher and friend, Story, he went also to Clark. Both remained at Clark as mathematics professors until retirement in 1921.

His brother, Robert Taber, was a well known Broadway theatre actor.

Taber promulgated linear algebra as expressed with matrices, in particular the symmetric matrix, skew-symmetric matrix, and orthogonal matrix.

Works
The papers by Henry Taber have been listed by Bibliographica Hopkinsiensis
 1890: On the Theory of Matrices, American Journal of Mathematics 12: 337 via Hathi Trust
 1891: "On certain Identities in the Theory of Matrices", American Journal of Mathematics 13
 1891: "On the application to matrices of any order of the quaternion symbols S and V", Proceedings of the London Mathematical Society 22
 1891: "On certain properties of symmetric, skew-symmetric and orthogonal matrices", Proceedings of the London Mathematical Society 22
 1891: "On the matrical equation φ Ω = Ω φ", Proceedings of the American Academy of Arts and Sciences 18
 1891: "On a theorem of Sylvester's relating to non-degenerate matrices", Proceedings of the American Academy of Arts and Science 19
 1892: "Note on representation of orthogonal matrices", Proceedings of the American Academy of Arts and Science 19
 1893: "On real orthogonal substitution", Proceedings of the American Academy of Arts and Science 20
 1893: "On the linear transformations between two quadrics", Journal of the London Mathematical Society 24
 1894: "On orthogonal substitutions that can be expressed as a function of a single alternate (or skew-symmetric) substitution", American Journal of Mathematics 16

References

Bibliography

External links 
 
 

19th-century American mathematicians
20th-century American mathematicians
Johns Hopkins University alumni
Johns Hopkins University faculty
Clark University faculty
1860 births
1936 deaths